Waikuri (Guaycura, Waicura) is an extinct language of southern Baja California spoken by the Waikuri or Guaycura people. The Jesuit priest Baegert documented words, sentences and texts in the language between 1751 and 1768.

Waikuri may be, along with the Yukian and Chumashan languages and other languages of southern Baja such as Pericú, among the oldest languages established in California, before the arrival of speakers of Penutian, Uto-Aztecan, and perhaps even Hokan languages. All are spoken in areas with long-established populations of a distinct physical type.

Name
The ethnonym Waikuri and its variants likely originates from the Pericú word guaxoro 'friend'. Variations of the name include Waicuri, Waicuri, Guaicuri, Waicura, Guaycura, Guaicura, Waicuro, Guaicuro, Guaycuro, Vaicuro, Guaicuru, Guaycuru, Waikur.

Classification
Baegert's data is analyzed by Raoul Zamponi (2004). On existing evidence, Guaycura appears to be unrelated to the Yuman languages to its north. Some linguists have suggested that it belonged to the widely scattered Hokan phylum of California and Mexico (Gursky 1966; Swadesh 1967); however, the evidence for this seems inconclusive (Laylander 1997; Zamponi 2004; Mixco 2006). William C. Massey (1949) suggested a connection with Pericú, but the latter is too meagerly attested to support a meaningful comparison. Other languages of southern Baja are essentially undocumented, though people have speculated from non-linguistic sources that Monqui (Monquí-Didiú), spoken in a small region around Loreto, may have been a 'Guaicurian' language, as perhaps was Huchití (Uchití), though that may have actually been a variety of Guaycura itself (Golla 2007).

The internal classification of Guaicurian (Waikurian) languages is uncertain. Massey (1949), cited in Campbell (1997:169), gives this tentative classification based on similarity judgments given by colonial-era sources, rather than actual linguistic data.

Guaicurian (Waikurian)
Guaicura branch
Guaocura (Waikuri)
Callejue
Huchiti branch
Cora
Huchiti
Aripe
Periúe
Pericú branch
Pericú
Isleño

However, Laylander (1997) and Zamponi (2004) conclude that Waikuri and Pericú are unrelated.

Phonology
Phonology of the Waikuri language:

Consonants 
Consonants were voiceless stops p t c k and maybe glottal stop; voiced b d, nasal m n ny, flap r, trill rr, and approximants w y.

Vowels 
Waikuri had four vowels, /i, e, a, u/. Whether or not vowel length was phonemic is unknown.

Grammar
The little we know of Guaycura grammar was provided by Francisco Pimentel, who analyzed a few verbs and phrases. Guaicura was a polysyllabic language that involved a lot of compounding. For example, 'sky' is tekerakadatemba, from tekaraka (arched) and datemba (earth). 

Beagert and Pimentel agree that the plural is formed with a suffix -ma. However, Pimentel also notes a prefix k- with the 'same' function. For example, kanai 'women', from anai 'woman'. According to Pimentel, the negation in -ra of an adjective resulted in its opposite, so from ataka 'good' is derived atakara 'bad'. 

Pronouns were as follows (Golla 2011):

Text
The Pater Noster is recorded in Guaycura, with a literal gloss by Pimentel (1874: cap. XXV). 

{| class="wikitable"
! style="background:#efefef;" colspan=10 | Kepe-dare
|-
! style="background:#efefef;" colspan=10 | Padre Nuestro
|-
| Kepe-dare	
| tekerekadatemba	
| daï,	
| ei-ri	
| akatuike 
| pu-me,| tschakarrake| pu-me| ti| tschie.|-
| Padre nuestro 
| (que en el) cielo
| estás,
| te 
| reconocemos
| todos (los que) existimos
| (y te) alaban
| todos (los que) somos	
| hombres	
| y. 
|-
| Ecun| gracia| ri| atume| cate| tekerekedatemba| tschie.| Ei-ri| jebarrakeme| ti|-
|(Y por) tu	
| gracia	
| ?	
| tengamos	
| nosotros
| (el) cielo	 
| (y).	
| Te	
| obedeceremos	 
| (los) hombres
|-
| pu| jaupe| datemba| pae| ei| jebarrakere| aëna| kea.| Kepekun| bue|-
| todos	
| aquí	 
| (en la) tierra	
| como	
| a ti
| obedientes	
| arriba	 
| siendo.	
| Nuestra	
| comida
|-
| kepe| ken| jatupe| untairi.| Kate| kuitscharrake| tei| tschie| kepecun| atakamara,|-
| (a) nos	
| da	
| este	
| día.	
| (Y a) nos
| perdona		
|
| (y)	
| nuestro	
| malo (pecado),
|-
| pae| kuitscharrakere| cate| tschie| cavape| atacamara| kepetujake.| Cate| tikakamba| tei|-
| como	
| perdonamos	
| nosotros	
| también	
| (a) los
| (que) mal	 
| (nos) hacen.	
| (A) nos	
| ayuda	
|
|-
| tschie| cuvume| ra| cate| uë| atukiara.| Kepe 
| kakunja| pe| atacara|-
| y	
| (no) querremos	
| no	
| nosotros	
| algo
| malo.	
| (Y a) nos	
| protege	
| de	
| mal
|-
| tschie.|-
| y.
|}

Vocabulary
Waikuri vocabulary from Zamponi (2004), which was compiled primarily from 18th-century sources by Johann Jakov Baegert, as well as from Lamberto Hostell and Francisco de Ortega:

Nouns

Pronouns

Other parts of speech

References

 Golla, Victor. 2007. Atlas of the World's Languages.
 Golla, Victor. 2011. California Indian Languages.
 Gursky, Karl-Heinz. 1966. "On the historical position of Waicuri". International Journal of American Linguistics 32:41–45.
 Laylander, Don. 1997. "The linguistic prehistory of Baja California". In Contributions to the Linguistic Prehistory of Central and Baja California, edited by Gary S. Breschini and Trudy Haversat, pp. 1–94. Coyote Press, Salinas, California.
 Massey, William C. 1949. "Tribes and languages of Baja California". Southwestern Journal of Anthropology 5:272–307.
 Mixco, Mauricio J. 2006. "The indigenous languages". In The Prehistory of Baja California: Advances in the Archaeology of the Forgotten Peninsula, edited by Don Laylander and Jerry D. Moore, pp. 24–41. University Press of Florida, Gainesville.
 Swadesh, Morris. 1967. "Lexicostatistical Classification". in Linguistics, edited by Norman A. McQuown, pp. 79–115. Handbook of Middle American Indians, Vol. 5, Robert Wauchope, general editor. University of Texas Press, Austin.
 Zamponi, Raoul. 2004. "Fragments of Waikuri (Baja California)". Anthropological Linguistics'' 46:156–193.

Indigenous languages of the Americas
Extinct languages
Language isolates of North America
Languages extinct in the 18th century
18th-century disestablishments in North America